Serravalle Castle is a ruined castle in the municipality of Serravalle of the Canton of Ticino in Switzerland.  It is a Swiss heritage site of national significance.

See also
 List of castles in Switzerland

References

Cultural property of national significance in Ticino
Castles in the canton of Ticino